Disney XD (formerly Fox Kids Network, Fox Kids and Jetix) was a British and Irish pay television channel. First launching in October 1996, it originated from the United States block of the same name, and was operated under a joint-venture between Fox Television Entertainment and Saban Entertainment before moving along to the Euronext-operating Fox Kids Europe, and then rebranding itself to Jetix in January 2005 after The Walt Disney Company's prior-purchase of Fox Family Worldwide in October 2001. and then reaching to its final name in August 2009 after Disney acquired Jetix Europe.

The British version of Fox Kids was the first European variant before being expanded to other European countries during the late 1990s.

History

Fox Kids

In November 1995, Fox Broadcasting Company announced a strategic partnership with Saban Entertainment to launch branded Fox Kids channels in all regions apart from North America. This followed up with an attempt by Fox to acquire a 49% stake in TCC from owners Flextech in 1996, which in turn would allow for extra programmes from Saban to be added, but this deal fell through in August, with Fox still planning to branch off and launch their own network.

On September 27, 1996, it was announced that the British version of the Fox Kids Network would launch on October 19. This announcement was made a week after Fox announced to spin-off the US Fox Kids Network block into a joint-venture with Saban, known as Fox Kids Worldwide. On September 30, Viacom announced they may file a lawsuit against BSkyB, citifying that the launch of Fox Kids Network would breech their existing contract to operate Nickelodeon UK which prevented Sky from operating any rival children's networks to Nickelodeon. The reason being was that Sky was at the time, 40% owned by News Corporation.

However, the Fox Kids Worldwide formation with Saban prevented this, and the channel launched as planned on October 19, 1996. Broadcasting between the hours of 6am to 7pm, it was the first Fox Kids channel to launch in Europe and the second channel to launch under the name overall after the Australian version feed. Fox Kids time-shared originally with Sky 2 and later National Geographic Channel, before extending its hours to 10pm. Fox Kids consisted of live-action and animated comedy, drama, and action-adventure programmers for children of all ages, Fox Kids also programmed up to seven hours of advertisement-free educational series each week.

On October 5, 1998, Fox Kids was added to Cable & Wireless, replacing TCC Nordic.

In early 2001, Fox Kids claimed one million children watched the channel every week. Fox Kids also restructured its operations into two divisions, content and commercial. In June 2001, Fox Kids UK debuted their very first in-house production - Living with Lionel.

Disney Acquisition
On July 23, 2001, The Walt Disney Company announced to acquire Fox Family Worldwide from News Corporation and Saban Entertainment, which gave Disney 76% ownership of Fox Kids Europe which in turn included the British operations. The deal was closed in October 2001. Beforehand, Disney announced they would rebrand Fox Kids Europe, and in turn Fox Kids UK as a Disney-branded network, but this eventually was scrapped.

On January 11, 2002, it was announced that the channel would be added to Telewest's digital service on February 15, with new expanded hours ranging from 6:00am-10:00pm. The service was already available on Telewest's analogue cable operations.

In November 2003, Fox Kids began broadcasting 24 hours a day, seven days a week.

Jetix

Pre-Launch
On January 8, 2004, ABC Cable Networks Group, Fox Kids Europe and Fox Kids Latin America announced plans to rename its entire operations to Jetix, which implied action and adventure. In the United Kingdom, the transitioning to the Jetix brand began with an announcement on March 25, 2004, with Fox Kids UK announcing to launch a daily primetime block under the Jetix name beginning on April 3, airing from 3pm to 7pm, The block introduced several new programmes to Fox Kids' lineup - including Sonic X and Shaman King.

In September 2004, a monthly Jetix Magazine was launched as part of the rebrand, produced under license by Future Publishing. The magazine covered a wide aspect of content including news, interviews, music, and sports. Ronnie Cook, managing director at JCP, added: "We're excited to be able to offer this new UK title for kids. The Jetix Magazine will also provide viewers with a crucial marketing tool for upcoming channel activity."

In September 2004, the Jetix block became part of the morning line-up, between the hours of 7am to 9am.

Full rebranding
On 1 January 2005, Fox Kids was fully relaunched as Jetix. Cinema advertising campaign produced in-house was instigated to help promote the rebrand, Jetix marketing director Allan Stenhouse says: "Cinema is a fast-paced, action-packed environment where both the quality of visual and audio communication enables us to excite children about Jetix." Shortly after the rebranding, a new early-evening block was introduced named "Jetix Max". The Jetix Max slot included such shows as W.I.T.C.H., Totally Spies, Martin Mystery, Funky Cops, Power Rangers, PXG, and Black Hole High. Jetix Max was dropped in June 1, 2006, although it remained on other Jetix channels around Europe.

On September 26, 2007, Jetix signed a deal with Sky and Virgin to allow its content to be used on their video on demand services. Jetix and Nordic managing director Boel Ferguson said,  "We are excited about securing these deals and continue to pursue distribution opportunities to make Jetix programming even more accessible to consumers".  Further enhancement occurred on November 20, 2007, when its online website started to include video clips of its programmes.

Disney XD 

On December 28, 2008, Disney bought out the remaining 26% share in Jetix to acquire full ownership of the company.  Disney relaunched Jetix as Disney XD, in the United States, followed by relaunch in the UK in August 2009, replacing Jetix. That same month, Jetix's on-screen logo was removed and replaced with Disney XD's logo counting down the days to the launch.  Disney XD was aimed towards boys aged 6 to 14 with Disney Channel focusing more toward girls.

Disney XD eventually expanded to include live-action films and sports coverage developed in collaboration with ESPN and also introduced Aaron Stone, Phineas and Ferb and The Suite Life of Zack & Cody, and continued to air shows that previously aired on Jetix, such as Pokémon: Diamond and Pearl: Battle Dimension, Jimmy Two-Shoes, Kid vs. Kat, American Dragon: Jake Long and Phil of the Future.

Sky channel moves
On 1 February 2011, Disney XD swapped channel numbers with the HD version.

On 28 March 2013, Disney XD moved 633 to 622.

As part of Sky's major EPG reshuffle on 1 May 2018, Disney XD HD moved 607 to 611 on Sky, Disney XD +1 moved 608 to 612 on Sky, Disney XD moved 622 to 645 on Sky.

On 30 April 2020, Disney XD +1 ceased broadcast from 612 on Sky.

On 1 October 2020, Disney XD HD ceased broadcast from 611 on Sky.

On 1 October 2020, Disney XD ceased broadcast from 645 on Sky.

Closure 

The one-hour timeshift channel, Disney XD +1, was closed on 30 April 2020. Its Sky EPG slot was given to BabyTV.

Disney XD, along with its sister channels Disney Channel and Disney Junior, would officially close in the UK on 1 October 2020, after almost 24 years on-air, due to Disney failing to reach a new carriage deal with Sky and Virgin Media. The channel's content was transferred exclusively to Disney+. Amphibia was the final program to ever air its new content, and the final program to be broadcast on the day of its shut down was "Wonders of the Deep", an episode of the 2013 short TV series, Mickey Mouse. It then showed promos (the final promo being one for Big City Greens) before the channel froze for a few seconds, cutting into the channel's ident image and before it was closed.

The channels were removed from Virgin Media a day before the closure.

On 9 February 2023, Sky Kids took its former 707 slot on Virgin Media.

Pop-up channels
During 2017 and 2018, the now defunct timeshift channel of Disney XD occasionally was replaced by pop-up temporary channels which lasted a month. 
Spider-Man: On July 16, 2017, the channel was known as "Spider-Man Channel".
Mickey and Pals: On 4 September 2017, the channel was temporarily rebranded as "Mickey and Pals", which aired various programming from Disney Junior.
Avengers: On 1 April 2018, the channel was temporarily rebranded as Avengers channel, airing non-stop Avengers Assemble throughout the month as well as exclusive content to promote the release of Avengers: Infinity War. It reverted on 30 April 2018.

Programming

Disney XD HD
Disney XD HD, a high-definition simulcast of Disney XD, launched on Sky channel 633 on 18 October 2010 in the UK. The channel broadcasts HD versions of Disney XD's popular live action shows and animated programmes, such as Phineas and Ferb, I'm in the Band, Kick Buttowski: Suburban Daredevil and Zeke and Luther. This marks Sky's fiftieth HD channel, meeting Sky's HD channel target of 50 HD channels by Christmas 2010.

Launch events

Disney XD launched with a large launch campaign. Four launch initiatives were designed to introduce Disney XD to children in the UK:

Beach Soccer
In May 2009, Beach Soccer was a joint initiative between England Beach Soccer and Disney XD, holding Beach Soccer Roadshows across central and Southern England. An artificial beach was built in each of the five locations: Portsmouth, Nottingham, Minehead, Hyde, (Greater Manchester) culminating in a Beach Soccer final on Oxford Street, London on Saturday 29 August 2009. In  June 2012, the event came to Sunderland.

Dance with Diversity
Britain's Got Talent winners Diversity helped to launch Disney XD by accepting a challenge to teach 100 young street dancers a one-off routine and then perform it in front of the crowds in Covent Garden. Diversity were given just a few days to teach the 100 young dancers the routine and how to perform it all together. Disney XD set the challenge to Diversity to help inspire kids to learn new activities. The challenge was documented in the programme Disney XD Challenge: Diversity, which aired on Disney XD in September 10, 2009.

Skate Britain
British skateboarder, Pete King, skated his way across the UK to help get kids out and skateboarding as part of the launch of Disney XD.

From Land's End to John O'Groats, Pete King conducted master classes for kids looking to become the next British skateboarding stars. Pete's challenge was part of a series of challenges which Disney XD set for UK personalities to help inspire kids to try new activities. Viewers were able to watch the highlights of Pete's journey on Disney XD in October 23, 2009.

World record attempt
Friday 28 August 2009, saw history being made as 250 children came together to form a giant 'human joystick' to set the new world record for the biggest ever game of virtual keepy-uppy, with former England and Liverpool F.C. football star and gaming fan, Jamie Redknapp, led the bid to enter the Guinness Book of World Records.

References

Disney television channels in the United Kingdom
United Kingdom and Ireland
Children's television channels in Ireland
Children's television channels in the United Kingdom
English-language television stations in the United Kingdom
English-language television stations in Ireland
2009 establishments in the United Kingdom
Television channels and stations established in 2009
2020 disestablishments in Ireland
2020 disestablishments in the United Kingdom
Television channels and stations disestablished in 2020
Defunct television channels in the United Kingdom
Television channel articles with incorrect naming style